Irina Kuzmina-Rimša (born 16 January 1986) is a retired Latvian tennis player.

In her career, she won two singles and eight doubles titles on the ITF Circuit. On 13 October 2008, she reached her best singles ranking of world No. 307. On 13 July 2009, she peaked at No. 193 in the WTA doubles rankings.

Kuzmina has a 19–13 record for Latvia in Fed Cup competition.

After retiring from professional tennis, Kuzmina-Rimša became a beach tennis player.

ITF finals

Singles: 6 (2–4)

Doubles: 19 (8–11)

References

External links
 
 
 

1986 births
Living people
Sportspeople from Riga
Latvian female tennis players
Female tennis players playing beach tennis
Latvian people of Russian descent